Barbarian Invasion may refer to:

 The so-called 'barbarian invasions' contemporaneous with the fall of the Roman Empire
 Barbarian Invasion (film), written and directed by Tan Chui Mui (2021)
 The Barbarian Invasions (Les Invasions barbares), a movie by Denys Arcand
 Rome Total War: Barbarian Invasion, an expansion pack in the Rome: Total War computer game